Ron Gentry (born 1943) is an American politician. He served as a Democratic member for the 7th district of the New Mexico House of Representatives.

Born in Belen, New Mexico, Gentry attended Ventura College. In 1992, he was elected to represent the 7th district of the New Mexico House of Representatives. He served until 1998, when he was succeeded by P. Vickers.

In 2019, Gentry bought a building in Rio Communities, New Mexico, intending to donate it for use as a healthcare facility.

References 

1943 births
Living people
People from Belen, New Mexico
Democratic Party members of the New Mexico House of Representatives
20th-century American politicians
Ventura College alumni